Giovana Prado Pass (born 30 March 1998) is a Brazilian Olympic dressage rider. Representing Brazil, she competed at the 2016 Summer Olympics in Rio de Janeiro where she finished 47th in the individual and 10th in the team competitions.

References

Living people
1998 births
Brazilian female equestrians
Brazilian dressage riders
Equestrians at the 2016 Summer Olympics
Olympic equestrians of Brazil